Aman Resorts is the trading entity of Aman Group Sarl, a Swiss-headquartered multinational hospitality company. Founded by Indonesian hotelier Adrian Zecha in 1988, the company operates 34 properties in 20 countries. Vladislav Doronin is the chief executive officer, chairman, and owner.

History

Founding 
Founded in 1988, Aman Resorts' first destination was the result of hotelier Adrian Zecha's desire to build a holiday home in Phuket. His plans soon developed into an idea to build a small boutique resort with Anil Thadani and two other friends. They invested their own money in the venture as no banks would lend for the project due to the small number of planned rooms. The resort opened as Amanpuri in 1988, with nightly rates reportedly five times higher than local competitors.

By 1992, following the success of the first hotel, the group had expanded to include several resorts in Indonesia, a resort on Bora Bora and one in the Alpine village of Courchevel. Later, Clement Vaturi acquired a majority stake in the company, thereby allowing the boutique hotels to be further conceptualized.

First ownership dispute (1998) 
In 1998, Vaturi's controlling interest was acquired by Los Angeles-based Colony Capital, a real estate investment fund. A lawsuit between Vaturi and Colony Capital promised to drag on, and Colony Capital moved to protect its interests by taking a more active role in the company. At this time, Zecha resigned from his position at Aman and pursued other interests for the next two years.

In 2000, Colony Capital and Vaturi settled their lawsuit, and Vaturi sold his shareholding interests to Lee Hing Development, a Hong Kong investment company. With controlling investors allowing full control over the company, Zecha returned as chairman and CEO. Over the next seven years, Aman launched retreats in Cambodia, India, Bhutan, Sri Lanka, and the Caribbean. On 27 November 2007, DLF, India's largest real estate company, acquired Lee Hing's controlling stake in Aman Resorts for $400 million, including debt of $150 million.

Second ownership dispute (2014) 
In early February 2014, DLF sold Aman Resorts for $358 million to Aman Resorts Group, an investment company led by Russian businessman Vladislav Doronin, which also included Omar Amanat. The sale included all Aman properties except for the Lodhi Hotel in Delhi. DLF sold Aman Resorts to reduce its debt and refocus on real estate after it had expanded into hotels, wind farms, and running export processing zones. In April, Zecha stepped down as chairman a second time, and the company relocated its headquarters from Singapore to London in June. Its corporate headquarters has since been moved to Baar, Switzerland. Doronin assumed the position of chairman, and French hotelier Olivier Jolivet was appointed chief executive officer in 2014.

Aman under Doronin (2015–present) 
In August 2015, Doronin became the sole owner of Aman when Pontwelly Holding Company, took full ownership of the hospitality business, Silverlink Resorts. Following this restructuring, Doronin and board director Alan Djanogly remain the only two directors. In February 2017, Roland Fasel joined Aman as chief operating officer, continuing a 25-plus-year career in luxury hospitality. Olivier Jolivet left the company the same year and Doronin assumed the position of chief executive officer.

In 2020, Doronin unveiled Janu, a spun-off brand to operate larger hotels in Japan, Montenegro, and Saudi Arabia, reportedly aiming to become a slightly more affordable complement to Aman. The group's diversification strategy continued in 2021 with the launching a clothing line, marking a shift towards becoming a self-proclaimed lifestyle brand.

In August 2022, Aman New York opened, occupying the former Crown Building.

Hotels

Each Aman property typically has a small number of rooms, usually fewer than 55. The brand is often characterised by media outlets to offer remarkable service, with many of its properties reportedly having a staff count typically of six staff to one guest.

Outside urban settings, guest accommodation is typically provided in individual private villas, pavilions, or tents (in the case of Aman-i-Khás in India, Amanwana in Indonesia, and Amanpulo in the Philippines), and often includes private outdoor lounging and dining areas.

Aman mandates a concern for cultural preservation, and several properties are said to have some historical background and importance. In Cambodia, for instance, the company acquired a ruined guest villa that had been built in the early 1960s by the country's King Sihanouk. All architectural records of the villa had been destroyed, but the discovery of an old tourist book with pictures of the building allowed the company to closely replicate what had been lost.

Since its establishment, Aman has been highly rated by Condé Nast Traveler, Zagat Survey, Gallivanter's Guide, Harper's Hideaway" and Travel & Leisure. 34% of Aman patrons reportedly originate from Europe, another 34% from Asia-Pacific, 28% from the Americas and 4% from the rest of the world.

Architects
Among the architects who have designed Aman properties are Emine Ögün, Ed Tuttle, Jaya Ibrahim, Jean-Michel Gathy (Denniston), Kerry Hill, Marwan Al-Sayed, Mehmet Ögün, Peter Muller, Rick Joy, Turgut Cansever,

Controversy 
In January 2023 Charles McGonigal, global director of security for Aman Group, was arrested on charges of money laundering and violating US sanctions law. According to the US Department of Justice, McGonigal conspired with a former Russian diplomat to assist Oleg Deripaska, a sanctioned Russian oligarch. McGonigal’s hiring in the spring of 2022 was done through a very obscure process, according to Aman staffers, and raised many eyebrows because the previous director of corporate security was reassigned for no apparent reasons and because when reports that McGonigal was under investigation had surfaced and the first witnesses were scheduled to appear before the grand jury investigation of his conduct, he continued to be retained by the company.

Locations
As of 2019, the group operates the following resorts (in order of opening):
 Amanpuri on the island of Phuket, Thailand. Designed by Ed Tuttle (1988)
 Amandari at Kedewatan on the outskirts of Ubud, on the island of Bali in Indonesia. Designed by Peter Muller (1989)
 Amankila near Manggis on the island of Bali in Indonesia. Designed by Ed Tuttle and Danilo Capellini (1992)
 Aman Villas at Nusa Dua on the island of Bali in Indonesia. Designed by Kerry Hill and Danilo Capellini, interiors by Dale Keller (1992)
 Aman Le Mélézin in Courchevel, France. Designed by Ed Tuttle (1992)
 Amanpulo on the island of Pamalican in the Philippines. Designed by Bobby Manosa (1993)
 Amanwana on Moyo Island, at the western end of Indonesia's Nusa Tenggara archipelago. Designed by Denniston of Jean-Michel Gathy (1993)
 Amanjiwo at Sawah, near Borobudur in Central Java, Indonesia. Designed by Ed Tuttle (1997)
 Amangani at East Gros Ventre Butte near Jackson Hole in United States. Designed by Ed Tuttle (1998)
 Amanjena on Route de Ouarzazate on the outskirts of Marrakech in Morocco. Designed by Ed Tuttle (2000)
 Amansara in Siem Reap, Cambodia. Designed by Kerry Hill (2002)
 Aman-i-Khas in Sherpur near Ranthambore Fort, Rajasthan, India. Designed by Denniston of Jean-Michel Gathy (2003)
 Amankora has five lodges in Thimphu, Bhutan. Designed by Kerry Hill (2004)
 Amanbagh in Ajabgarh near Bhangarh Fort, Rajasthan, India. Designed by Ed Tuttle (2005)
 Amangalla in Galle, Sri Lanka. Interiors designed by Kerry Hill (2005)
 Amanwella near Tangalle on Sri Lanka's south coast. Designed by Kerry Hill (2005)
 Amanyara on Providenciales, Turks and Caicos Islands. Designed by Denniston of Jean-Michel Gathy (2006)
 Aman at Summer Palace in Beijing, China. Technical assistance by Denniston of Jean-Michel Gathy and interiors designed by Jaya Ibrahim (2008)
 Villa Miločer, phase one of Aman Sveti Stefan, located on the coast of Montenegro. Designed by Denniston of Jean-Michel Gathy (2008)
 Amangiri in Utah's Lake Powell Region, the United States. Designed by Marwan Al-Sayed, Rick Joy, and Wendell Burnett (2009)
 Amantaka in Luang Prabang, Laos (2009)
 Amanfayun in Hangzhou, China. Designed by Jaya Ibrahim (2010)
 Amanrüya in Bodrum, Turkey. Designed by Turgut Cansever, Emine Ögün, and Mehmet Ögün (2011)
 Amanzoe in Peloponnese, Greece. Designed by Ed Tuttle (2012)
 Aman Venice in Venice, Italy. Designed by Denniston of  Jean-Michel Gathy (2013), Elastic Architects
 Amanoi in Vĩnh Hy Bay, Vietnam. Designed by Denniston of  Jean-Michel Gathy (2013)
 Aman Tokyo in Tokyo, Japan. Designed by Kerry Hill (2014)
 Amandayan in Lijiang, China. Designed by Jaya Ibrahim (2015)
 Amanera in Rio San Juan, Dominican Republic. Designed by John Heah (2015)
 Amanemu in Shima, Japan. Designed by Kerry Hill (2016)
 Amanyangyun on the outskirts of Shanghai, China. Designed by Kerry Hill (2017)
 Aman Kyoto in Kyoto, Japan. Designed by Kerry Hill (2019)
 Hotel Rosa Alpina in the Dolomites, Italy. (2020)
 Aman New York in New York City, NY, United States. Designed by Denniston of Jean-Michel Gathy. (2022)

Gallery

See also

References

External links 

 
 Cohen, E. "Subtlety and Luxury - Jean-Michel Gathy does it again at Amanyara in the Turks and Caicos," Interior Design, July 1, 2006.
  Phoenicia Times Feb 2008
  Hartwick College The Gerry Family Papers

 
Boutique resort chains
Hospitality companies of Singapore
Hotel chains
Luxury brands
Singaporean brands
Hotel chains in Switzerland
Hospitality companies of Switzerland
Hospitality companies established in 1988